The Touch of Your Lips is an album by trumpeter/vocalist Chet Baker which was recorded in 1979 and released on the Danish SteepleChase label.

Reception 

The Allmusic review by Scott Yanow states "This was the perfect setting during his later years. The trumpeter (who also sings on two of the six songs) sounds very relaxed and comfortable".

Track listing 
 "I Waited for You" (Dizzy Gillespie, Gil Fuller) – 8:08
 "But Not for Me" (George Gershwin, Ira Gershwin) – 6:04
 "Autumn in New York" (Vernon Duke) – 5:57
 "The Blue Room" (Richard Rodgers, Lorenz Hart) – 8:40		
 "The Touch of Your Lips" (Ray Noble) – 8:19
 "Star Eyes" (Gene de Paul, Don Raye) – 5:45	
 "Autumn in New York" [take 2] (Duke) – 4:47 Bonus track on CD release

Personnel 
Chet Baker – trumpet, vocals
Doug Raney – guitar 
Niels-Henning Ørsted Pedersen – bass

References 

Chet Baker albums
1979 albums
SteepleChase Records albums